Evangel Bible College, formerly South Central Bible Institute, is located at 1744 Lakandula Drive, Daraga, Albay, Philippines. This is a Bible college of the Philippines General Council of the Assemblies of God, Valenzuela City. The school is a member of the Asia Pacific Theological Association.

Debbie Johnson was its president from 2007 to 2009. The current president is Nelly Fulgencio.

See also
List of Assemblies of God schools

References

External links
 PGCAG

Universities and colleges in Albay
Seminaries and theological colleges in the Philippines
Assemblies of God seminaries and theological colleges